Bichand (also Romanized as Bīchand; also known as Beshand, Beshnad, Biahand, Biçand, Biehand, Bījend, and Bīūhand) is a village in Neh Rural District, in the Central District of Nehbandan County, South Khorasan Province, Iran. At the 2006 census, its population was 1,297, in 290 families.

References 

Populated places in Nehbandan County